The Cathedral of Our Lady of Perpetual Succour (Katedrala Gospe od Neprestane Pomoći) also known as Precinct of the Lady Helper Church and Con-cathedral of the Lady Helper. Is a Roman Catholic cathedral in Prizren, Kosovo, seat of the Albanian Roman Catholic Diocese of Prizren-Pristina.

History 
The Cathedral of Prizren was commissioned in 1870 by Dario Bucciarelli, Archbishop of Skopje. Its clocktower was built by Thomas Glasnovic, a Croatian monk and architect. The cathedral among its frescoes features in the north side of the church a fresco of Skanderbeg painted in 1883 by Gjergj Panariti an Albanian monk and painter from Korçë.

Notes

References 
 Official web page of the diocese (English) 
 Catholic Church web page (Albanian) 
 Kosovo By Gail Warrander, Verena Knaus https://books.google.com/books?id=GCRjKdrmqqEC
 List of Churches: http://www.metaltraveller.com/en/trips/kosovo/prizren_churches.html
 Openstreetmap location 
 Report on Churches in Kosovo 
 Archeological Report of Prizren
 Images and more images

Roman Catholic cathedrals in Kosovo
Cultural heritage of Kosovo
Churches in Prizren
Cultural heritage monuments in Prizren District